The Pecos River originates in north-central New Mexico and flows into Texas, emptying into the Rio Grande. Its headwaters are on the eastern slope of the Sangre de Cristo mountain range in Mora County north of Pecos, New Mexico, at an elevation of over 12,000 feet (3,700 m). The river flows for 926 miles (1,490 km) before reaching the Rio Grande near Del Rio. Its drainage basin encompasses about 44,300 square miles (115,000 km2).

The name "Pecos" derives from the Keresan (Native American language) term for the Pecos Pueblo, [p'æyok'ona]. The river was also historically referred to as the Río Natagés for the Mescalero people.

History
The river was the eastern territory of the Faraon (‘Pharaoh’) Apache Indians, a tribe of Apache, probably closely related to the Mescalero Apache, if not part of them. Their divisions were Ancavistis, Jacomis, Orejones, Carlanes, and Cuampes, but of these the Carlanes at least belonged to the Jicarillas. The river later played a large role in the exploration of Texas by the Spanish. In the latter half of the 19th century, "West of the Pecos" was a reference to the rugged desolation of the Wild West. New Mexico and Texas disputed water rights to the river until the U.S. government settled the dispute in 1949 with the Pecos River Compact. The Pecos River Settlement Agreement was signed between New Mexico and Texas in 2003.

Dams
Multiple dams have been built along the Pecos River. Santa Rosa Lake is 117 miles/188 km east of Albuquerque. Sumner Lake, formed by the 1939 Sumner Dam, is located between Santa Rosa and Fort Sumner, NM. Texas has also dammed the river at the Red Bluff Dam in the western part of that state to form the Red Bluff Reservoir. The portion of the reservoir that extends into New Mexico forms the lowest point in that state.

Wild and Scenic river
On June 6, 1990,  of the Pecos River—from its headwaters to the townsite of Tererro—received National Wild and Scenic River designation. It includes  designated "wild" and  designated "recreational".

Pecos River Flume

The Pecos River Flume is an aqueduct carrying irrigation water over the Pecos River. Construction took place from 1889 to 1890 and was part of the Pecos River Reclamation Project. It was originally constructed of wood and spanned . In 1902, a flood destroyed the flume and it was subsequently rebuilt using concrete. In 1902, it was identified as the largest concrete aqueduct in the world.

The flume and its surrounding area have been reclaimed by the city of Carlsbad and transformed into a tourist attraction, with park improvements along the river and spotlights to give a spectacular nightly view.

See also
 List of longest rivers of the United States (by main stem)
 List of tributaries of the Rio Grande
 List of rivers of New Mexico
 List of rivers of Texas

References

External links

 
Rivers of New Mexico
Rivers of Texas
Tributaries of the Rio Grande
Wild and Scenic Rivers of the United States
Rivers of Eddy County, New Mexico
Rivers of San Miguel County, New Mexico
Bodies of water of Ward County, Texas
Rivers of Val Verde County, Texas
Bodies of water of Loving County, Texas
Bodies of water of Reeves County, Texas
Bodies of water of Pecos County, Texas
Bodies of water of Crane County, Texas
Bodies of water of Crockett County, Texas
Bodies of water of Terrell County, Texas
Pecos, Texas